Francisco Javier 'Javi' Sáiz Soria (born 16 May 1984 in Cuenca, Castile-La Mancha) is a Spanish former professional footballer who played as either a central defender or a defensive midfielder.

References

External links

1984 births
Living people
People from Cuenca, Spain
Sportspeople from the Province of Cuenca
Spanish footballers
Footballers from Castilla–La Mancha
Association football defenders
Association football midfielders
Association football utility players
Segunda División players
Segunda División B players
Tercera División players
Real Madrid C footballers
UB Conquense footballers
CD Guadalajara (Spain) footballers
CD Mirandés footballers
Racing de Santander players
Huracán Valencia CF players